Florida station is an RTD light rail station in Aurora, Colorado, United States. The station, located at the intersection of East Florida Avenue and South Abilene Street, is served by the H Line and R Line. A pedestrian bridge connects the station platform on the east side of I-225 with The Medical Center of Aurora and related medical offices as well as the residential neighborhood on the west side of I-225.

During planning and construction, RTD designated the station "Medical Center of Aurora – Florida"; the reference to the hospital was dropped prior to the station's opening on February 24, 2017.

This is the southern terminus of the H line, trains use a pocket track just north of the station to reverse directions.

References

RTD light rail stations
Transportation buildings and structures in Aurora, Colorado
Railway stations in the United States opened in 2017
2017 establishments in Colorado